A crus fracture is a fracture of the lower legs bones meaning either or both of the tibia and fibula.

Tibia fractures
 Pilon fracture
 Tibial plateau fracture
 Tibia shaft fracture
 Bumper fracture - a fracture of the lateral tibial plateau caused by a forced valgus applied to the knee
 Segond fracture - an avulsion fracture of the lateral tibial condyle
 Gosselin fracture - a fractures of the tibial plafond into anterior and posterior fragments
 Toddler's fracture - an undisplaced and spiral fracture of the distal third to distal half of the tibia

Fibular fracture
 Maisonneuve fracture - a spiral fracture of the proximal third of the fibula associated with a tear of the distal tibiofibular syndesmosis and the interosseous membrane.
 Le Fort fracture of ankle - a vertical fracture of the antero-medial part of the distal fibula with avulsion of the anterior tibiofibular ligament.
 Bosworth fracture - a fracture with an associated fixed posterior dislocation of the proximal fibular fragment which becomes trapped behind the posterior tibial tubercle. The injury is caused by severe external rotation of the ankle.
 , a fracture of the postero-lateral rim of the distal fibula.

Combined tibia and fibula fracture
 Trimalleolar fracture - involving the lateral malleolus, medial malleolus and the distal posterior aspect of the tibia
 Bimalleolar fracture - involving the lateral malleolus and the medial malleolus.
 Pott's fracture - is an archaic term loosely applied to a variety of bimalleolar ankle fractures.

References

Bone fractures